Thalycra is a genus of sap-feeding beetles in the family Nitidulidae. There are at least 20 described species in Thalycra.

Species
These 20 species belong to the genus Thalycra:

 Thalycra acuta Howden, 1961
 Thalycra andrewsi Cline, 2007
 Thalycra carolina (Wickham, 1920)
 Thalycra concolor (LeConte, 1850)
 Thalycra dentata Howden, 1961
 Thalycra emmanueli Auroux, 1967
 Thalycra fervida (Olivier, 1790)
 Thalycra intermedia Howden, 1961
 Thalycra keltoni Howden, 1961
 Thalycra knulli (Howden, 1961)
 Thalycra leechi Howden, 1961
 Thalycra mexicana Howden, 1961
 Thalycra mixta Howden, 1961
 Thalycra monticola Howden, 1961
 Thalycra murrayi (Horn, 1879)
 Thalycra orientalis Howden, 1961
 Thalycra parsonsi Howden, 1961
 Thalycra sinuata Howden, 1961
 Thalycra truncata Howden, 1961
 Thalycra wittmeri Jelínek, 1982

References

Further reading

External links

 

Nitidulidae
Articles created by Qbugbot